A Line a Day Must Be Enough! is a 2008 documentary film directed by Katrin Ottarsdóttir. It is a portrait of the Faroese poet, painter and performance artist Tóroddur Poulsen (born 1957). He has been referred to as the "black punk poet" of the Faroes, though this epithet is probably too narrow, it is precisely his anarchistic, experimental and subtle approach to poetry as well as life, which characterizes his artistic work.

Synopsis 
In a film bursting with lyrics, pictures, and music the director shows us a way into the peculiar universe of Tóroddur, and the otherwise not very talkative artist gives us a glimpse of his thoughts on art, God, life and death.

References

External links 
 Blue Bird Film, website of filmmaker Katrin Ottarsdóttir
 

2008 documentary films
2008 films
Danish documentary films
Faroese documentary films
Faroese-language films
Films directed by Katrin Ottarsdóttir